Simon Godwin is an English theatre director based in Washington, DC, where he is currently serving as artistic director of the Shakespeare Theatre Company. Previously he was based in London, serving as associate director of London's National Theatre, associate director of the Royal Court Theatre and associate director at Bristol Old Vic.

Education
Godwin was educated at St Albans School and Anna Scher Theatre School, an independent stage school in Islington in north London, followed by the St Catharine's College, Cambridge, where he studied English. In 2005 he began a two-year post graduate program at the London International School of Performing Arts (LISPA) where he studied physical theatre and devising.

Career
Simon began directing at Cambridge, and after graduating he began producing classical work including Romeo and Juliet for the Cambridge Arts Theatre and the Marlowe Society. Godwin was then assistant director to Dominic Dromgoole and Tim Supple. He then founded Stray Dogs Theatre Company producing Inkle and Yarico, as well as Eurydice at the BAC before it transferred to the Whitehall Theatre in the West End, which made it one of the youngest companies ever to have work staged in London's West End. This was followed by All's Well That Ends Well for a national tour.

In 2001 Simon became associate director at the Royal and Derngate Theatres in Northampton where he worked as the deputy to the artistic director, Rupert Goold and directed seven main stage shows, including The Seagull, Habeas Corpus, Relatively Speaking and with Salisbury Playhouse, and Quartermaine's Terms by Simon Gray.

In 2008 he joined Tom Morris, as the associate director of The Bristol Old Vic, where he directed The Little Mermaid, Krapp's Last Tape/A Kind of Alaska, Faith Healer and Far Away.

At the Tabard Theatre his production of The Country by Martin Crimp was well received, and in 2008 he became part of the Royal Court International Residency. At the Almeida Theatre in 2009 he directed All The Little Things We Crushed by Joel Horwood, followed by a critically acclaimed national tour of The Winter's Tale for Schtanhaus and Nuffield Theatre Southampton, in association with Headlong.

In 2009 Simon became associate director of the Royal Court. While there Simon directed seven world premieres, including Routes, If You Don't Let Us Dream, We Won't Let You Sleep, NSFW, The Witness, Goodbye to All That, The Acid Test, and Wanderlust, for which he was longlisted for Evening Standard Awards Best Newcomer in 2010.

Godwin subsequently joined Bristol Old Vic as associate director, directing productions of Far Away (Caryl Churchill) and Faith Healer (Brian Friel). The latter was subsequently remounted in 2012 as part of the Hong Kong Arts Festival.

In 2012 Simon was awarded the inaugural Evening Standard/Burberry Award for an Emerging Director.

In 2013 Simon made his debut at the National Theatre with Strange Interlude with Anne Marie Duff  followed by Man and Superman with Ralph Fiennes. When Rufus Norris became the new artistic director of the National Theatre in 2015, he invited Simon to become part of his team of permanent Associates.

Simon has also enjoyed a long-standing relationship with the Royal Shakespeare Company. In 2001 he directed The Two Gentlemen of Verona followed in 2016 by an acclaimed Hamlet, which toured to The Kennedy Center in Washington D.C. His Timon of Athens, starring Kathryn Hunter as Timon opened at the Royal Shakespeare Company in December 2018.

His production of Antony and Cleopatra with Ralph Fiennes and Sophie Okonedo opened at the National Theatre, London in September 2018. In May 2019, Simon made his Tokyo debut, directing a Japanese cast in Hamlet for Theatre Cocoon.'In September 2018, Simon was appointed artistic director of the Shakespeare Theatre Company Washington D.C. effective 1 August 2019. He made his directorial debut with the company in February 2020 with a remounted production of Timon of Athens with Kathryn Hunter reprising her role.

In August 2019, he directed Hansard in the Lyttelton Theatre at the National Theatre. Hansard'' was the debut play by writer Simon Woods and was broadcast in October 2019 by National Theatre Live.

In August 2020, he directed Romeo and Juliet at the National Theatre, with Josh O'Connor and Jessie Buckley playing the title roles. The performance was adapted for filming in 2021—the National Theatre's first such venture.

In July 2022, his production for the National Theatre of 'Much Ado About Nothing' opened in the Lyttelton Theatre starring Katherine Parkinson and John Heffernan.

Work

Godwin's directing career includes:

References

External links

Living people
English theatre directors
Alumni of the Anna Scher Theatre School
Date of birth missing (living people)
Year of birth missing (living people)